The United Renaissance Party is a Ghanaian political party registered with the Electoral Commission of Ghana. It was founded in 2007. Its first leader was Kofi Wayo.

In an interview in 2009, Kofi Wayo stated that the electoral rules in Ghana needed overhauling.

Wayo declared in 2017 that he was leaving politics for farming. He said he was keen to support farmers in villages while suggesting that politicians did not do so.

See also
 List of political parties in Ghana

References

External links
Political parties in Ghana, their emblems and colours

Political parties in Ghana
2007 establishments in Ghana
Political parties established in 2007